Stephen Guest, Barrister (Inner Temple) and Barrister and Solicitor (N.Z. High Court), is the Professor of Legal Philosophy at the University College London Faculty of Laws.

Education
Guest obtained his BA in Philosophy (1971) and his LLB at the University of Otago, his BLitt at University College, Oxford (1978) under Professor Ronald Dworkin, and his Ph.D. at University College London (1991).

Works
Amongst his major work is his account of Ronald Dworkin's legal, political and moral philosophy in Ronald Dworkin, Stanford University Press, 2012.

External links
UCL Faculty of Laws-Stephen Guest
Professor Stephen Guest

Alumni of University College, Oxford
Alumni of University College London
Academics of University College London
Living people
Members of the Inner Temple
University of Otago alumni
Year of birth missing (living people)
English legal writers
British legal scholars
Philosophers of law